Khaled Hadi  (born 1 February 1962) is a former Iraqi football midfielder who played for Iraq in the 1985 Pan Arab Games.

Hadi played for the national team in 1985.

References

Iraqi footballers
Iraq international footballers
Living people
Association football forwards
1962 births